"Song Of The Hindustani Minstrel" (originally published with the spelling "Hindoostani") is a poem by Henry Louis Vivian Derozio, published in 1827 as part of his first book of poetry.

The poem is structured around three main points. First the speaker describes the beauty of his beloved (a Kashmiri girl). Next, he speaks about poverty. Finally, he assures his beloved that soon they will see better days. At the end of the poem the poet presents the optimistic picture in front of his beloved, he says that though the world may change, their love for each other will remain the same, and will continue to love each other till their end. The poem has been compared to the vision of the lovers in the poem "The Last Ride Together" by Robert Browning.

References

1827 poems